Lee Jong-hyeon (born 8 May 1930) is a South Korean former sports shooter. He competed in the 25 metre pistol event at the 1964 Summer Olympics.

References

1930 births
Possibly living people
South Korean male sport shooters
Olympic shooters of South Korea
Shooters at the 1964 Summer Olympics
People from Wonsan
South Korean military personnel